Lal Draman (translation; Red Meadows) is a hill station in Indian union territory of Jammu and Kashmir. A Grameen-cum-Tourism Mela is organised every year in Lal Draman, depicting the cultural programs of Doda district. Thousand of tourists visits there to enjoy this mela. In 2013, construction of roads started in rural areas including Lal Draman.

Entomology
Lal Draman are two Kashmiri words: lal can mean red, and draman(dramun) means meadows.

About

It's beautiful landscapes, number of scenic spots for picnic, pleasant summer and snow in winter are the main attractions for tourists.

Tourism
Lal Draman is known for tourist attraction in Doda district, seasonally local and foreign tourist visits there. In winters there is usually a  snowfall for which tourist visits there for winter-sports like skiing. It's beautiful landscapes, scenic picnic spots and cultural festival are the main attraction for tourists. One day Grameen-cum-Tourism Mela organised every year in summers depicting the culture of Doda district and various cultural programmes performed in Sirazi, Bhaderwahi, Kashmiri and Urdu languages while many other sports like volleyball, kabaddi, horse racing, daku dances, animal shows, and other activities also performed on that day. The small mosque and temple built next to each other in Lal Draman, are said to be symbol of unity between Muslims and Hindus.

Road connectivity
The nearest bus stop is in Bijarni village, which can be reached by a  walk from Lal Draman.

Notes

References

Tourist attractions in Doda district
Chenab Valley